Oak Creek is a stream in the U.S. state of South Dakota. It is a tributary of the White River.

Oak Creek was named for the oak trees along its course.

See also
List of rivers of South Dakota

References

Rivers of Mellette County, South Dakota
Rivers of Todd County, South Dakota
Rivers of Tripp County, South Dakota
Rivers of South Dakota